Nigel D. Findley (July 22, 1959 – February 19, 1995) was a Canadian game designer, editor, and an author of science fiction and fantasy novels and role-playing games (RPGs).

Biography
Nigel Findley was born in Venezuela in 1959 to Canadian parents, and lived in Spain, Nigeria, the United States, and England before moving with his family to Vancouver in 1969.

He got his start as a role-playing game author in the mid 1980s during his business career.  By 1990 he had become a full-time writer, and had authored or coauthored over one hundred books, and twelve novels. He wrote for many game companies, including TSR, and for FASA's Shadowrun supplements and fiction. Findley's adventure The Universal Brotherhood (1990) for Shadowrun was well received. He got his start writing for Dungeons & Dragons, and won a 1992 Origins Award for GURPS Illuminati. In 1994 he was inducted into the Origins Awards Hall of Fame.

His body of work also included supplements for Mayfair's Roleaids line, Wizards of the Coast's The Primal Order, West End Games, and White Wolf Publishing. He is credited with parts of the design of Greyhawk Adventures and Fate of Istus, and wrote the whole of Greyspace. He was also part of the original core of Shadowrun RPG writers and designers, and has sole writing credit on both sourcebooks and Shadowrun world novels.

Findley died at home on February 19, 1995, in Vancouver, British Columbia, at the age of 35 from a sudden heart attack.

Legacy

The Nigel D. Findley Memorial Award was awarded for best role-playing product of the year between 1995 and 2001. The Castle Falkenstein role-playing game was the first winner of the award, while The Lord of the Rings Trading Card Game was the last documented winner.

Bibliography

Advanced Dungeons & Dragons
 Dragon magazine
 "The Ecology of the Peryton" (February 1984, Dragon issue #82)
 "The Ecology of the Will-o-Wisp" (July 1985, Dragon issue #99)
 "The Ecology of the Greenhag" (September 1987, Dragon issue #125)
 "The Ecology of the Gibbering Mouther" (August 1990, Dragon issue #160)
 "The Mind of the Vampire" (October 1990, Dragon issue #162)
 "Picture This!" (March 1992, Dragon issue 179)
 Dungeon magazine
 "Caermor" (November 1986, Dungeon issue 2)
 "Nightshade" (September 1987, Dungeon issue 7)
 "Light of Lost Souls" (July 1988, Dungeon issue 12)
 "A Question of Balance" (November 1988, Dungeon issue 14)
 "Necropolis" (March 1989, Dungeon issue 16)
 "The Serpent's Tooth" (September 1989, Dungeon issue 19)
 "White Fang" (November 1989, Dungeon issue 20)
 All game worlds
 The Castle Guide (1990 sourcebook) Design
 Tome of Magic (1991 sourcebook) Design
 Dungeons of Despair (1999 adventure) Coauthor
 Forgotten Realms
 Draconomicon (1990 sourcebook)
 Ninja Wars (1990 adventure)
 Cult of the Dragon, FR (1998) Additional/original design
 Greyhawk
 Greyhawk Adventures (1988 sourcebook) Additional design
 Fate of Istus (1989 adventure) Coauthor
 Lankhmar
 Thieves of Lankhmar (1990 adventure)
 Ravenloft
 Van Richten's Guide to Vampires (1991 sourcebook)
 Van Richten's Guide to Werebeasts (1993 sourcebook)
 Both reprinted in Van Richten's Monster Hunter's Compendium: Volume One (1999)
 Spelljammer
 Skull & Crossbows (1990 adventure)
 Practical Planetology (1991 sourcebook)
 Into the Void (1991 novel)
 Greyspace (1992 sourcebook) crossover with Greyhawk
 The Broken Sphere (1993 novel)
 Role Aids (unlicensed books published by Mayfair Games)
 Witches (1990 sourcebook)
 Psionics (1991 sourcebook)
 To Hell and Back, Realms of Fantasy (1993 boxed set)
 Seed of Darkness (1993 novel)

Shadowrun
 Sourcebooks
 The Universal Brotherhood (1990)
 Paranormal Animals of North America (1990)
 The Neo-Anarchist's Guide to North America (1991) "Quebec and Quebec City"
 Native American Nations, Volume One (1991)
 Native American Nations, Volume Two (1991)
 The Neo-Anarchists' Guide to Real Life (1992)
 Shadowrun, Second Edition (1992) Additional Material
 Tir Tairngire (1993)
 Corporate Shadowfiles (1993)
 Lone Star (1994)
 Denver: The City of Shadows (1994) with Tom Dowd and Tom Wong
 Aztlan (1995)
 Underworld Sourcebook (1997) Concepts
 Shadowrun Gamemaster Screen: "Critters" (1998) Other original design
 Adventures
 One Stage Before (1992)
 Paradise Lost (1994) with Tom Wong
 Double Exposure (1994) with Fraser Cane
 Harlequin's Back (1994) "Aftermath" and Story Development
 "Denver Double Cross" (Spring 1995, Adventures Unlimited, issue #1)
 Novels
 2XS (1991)
 Shadowplay (1993)
 Lone Wolf (1994)
 House of the Sun (1995)

Other RPGs
 Battletech: Virtual World
 No Limits (1996 novel)
 Bloodshadows
 Padarr Citybook (1995 sourcebook)
 Fires of Marl (1995 sourcebook) Additional Material
 Buck Rogers XXVC
 Phases of the Moon (1991 adventure)
 Chill
 Horrors of North America (1991 sourcebook)
 Voodoo (1992 sourcebook)
 Earthdawn
 Denizens of Earthdawn Volume Two (1993 sourcebook)
 The Adept's Way (1995 sourcebook) Coauthor
 Lost Kaer (1998 novel)
 GURPS
 GURPS Illuminati (1992 sourcebook)
 "Playing With Your Mind, Secret Knowledge from GURPS Illuminati" (April 1992, Roleplayer issue 28)
 Supporting Cast (1993 sourcebook) with Fraser Cain
 Warehouse 23 (1997 sourcebook) Additional Material
 The Primal Order
 Pawns: The Opening Move (1992 sourcebook)
 Knights: Strategies in Motion (1993 sourcebook)
 Star Wars: The Roleplaying Game
 Planet of the Mists (1992 adventure)
 Goroth: Slave of the Empire (1995 supplement)
 "Forbidden Fruit" (Summer 1995, Adventures Unlimited, issue #2)
 Storytelling System
 The Succubus Club (1991 adventure) Coauthor
 "Raiko" (February 1992, White Wolf, issue #30)
 Awakening: Diablerie Mexico (1992 adventure)
 Reprinted in the Diablerie compilation (1997)
 Dark Alliance: Vancouver (1993 sourcebook) with Geoff McMartin
 Street Fighter Player's Guide (1994 rulebook) Additional Writing
 Chicago Chronicles Vol. 1 (1996 sourcebook) Coauthor
 Torg
 Kanawa Personal Weapons (1991 sourcebook)
 Kanawa Heavy Weapons (1991 sourcebook)
 Kanawa Land Vehicles (1992 sourcebook)
 Out of Nippon (1992 novel)
 Underground
 Underground Notebook, (1993 sourcebook)
 Underground Player's Handbook (1994 sourcebook) Coauthor
 The Whispering Vault
 Dangerous Prey (1995 sourcebook)

References

External links
 Nigel Findley at RPG Geek
 

1959 births
1995 deaths
Dungeons & Dragons game designers
Canadian fantasy writers
Canadian science fiction writers
Writers from Vancouver